John Rhys Harris (born 1969) is a British journalist, writer and critic. He is the author of The Last Party: Britpop, Blair and the Demise of English Rock (2003); So Now Who Do We Vote For?, which examined the 2005 UK general election; a 2006 behind-the-scenes look at the production of Pink Floyd's The Dark Side of the Moon; and Hail! Hail! Rock'n'Roll (2009). His articles have appeared in Select, Q, Mojo, Shindig!, Rolling Stone, Classic Rock, The Independent, the New Statesman, The Times and The Guardian.

Early life
Harris was raised in Wilmslow in north Cheshire; his father was a university lecturer in nuclear engineering, and his mother a teacher who was the daughter of a nuclear research chemist. He became fixated by pop music at an early age.

He attended the comprehensive Wilmslow County High School (at the same time as members of the band Doves), then went to Loreto College, Manchester, a Roman Catholic sixth form college sited between the University of Manchester and Old Trafford. He applied to study Modern History at Keble College, Oxford, but was rejected, and claimed his membership of left-wing organisations had not won him many favours with such a traditional and conservative college. He spent three years studying Philosophy, Politics and Economics at another Oxford college, Queen's, between 1989 and 1992.

Media career
In 1991, Harris joined Melody Maker. Between 1993 and the summer of 1995, he wrote for the NME. In 1995, he was named editor of Select magazine after a brief stint with Q.

In 1995, Harris resumed his career as a freelance writer, writing about pop music, politics and a variety of other subjects. His articles have appeared in Q, Mojo, Rolling Stone, The Independent, the New Statesman, The Times and The Guardian.

He believes Britpop was a shining moment for the UK's music industry, and possibly the end of an era, with (manufactured) music now deliberately catering for the lowest common denominator. He presented a BBC Four documentary on the musical movement, The Britpop Story.

In addition to writing, Harris often appears on television programmes concerned with late 1980s/early 1990s British pop music, as well as being a regular pundit on BBC Two's Newsnight Review. In 2010 he created the video series Anywhere but Westminster for The Guardian, documenting the political feelings of people around the country. In December 2018 Harris wrote and presented a four-part BBC Radio 4 series, Tyranny of Story.

He is the editor of the companion book, published on 12 October 2021, of the documentary The Beatles: Get Back. The illustrated book compiles conversations recorded during the sessions of the album Let It Be. He also contributed a chapter in the hardcover book accompanying the release of the Let It Be: Special Edition that same year. In addition, he hosted a short promotional film for the project called The Beatles, Get Back and London: On the Trail of a Timeless Story.

Personal life
Harris lives in Frome, Somerset. He has been a ethical vegetarian since the mid-1980s.

Bibliography
 The Last Party: Britpop, Blair and the Demise of English Rock, published in May 2003 by Fourth Estate; the following year re-released as Britpop: Cool Britania and the Spectacular Demise of English Rock by Da Capo Press.
 So Now Who Do We Vote For?, an examination of the 2005 UK general election; published in 2005 by Faber and Faber.
 The Dark Side of the Moon: The Making of the Pink Floyd Masterpiece, published in 2005 by Da Capo Press.
 Hail! Hail! Rock'n'Roll: The Ultimate Guide to the Music, the Myths and the Madness, published in October 2009 by Sphere.

References

External links
 Official Site
 So Now Who Do We Vote For? blog not updated since 2005
 John Harris at Comment is Free (The Guardian)
 Newsnight Review

1969 births
Living people
Alumni of The Queen's College, Oxford
British agnostics
British male journalists
Britpop
English music journalists
Melody Maker writers
People from Wilmslow
The Guardian journalists
The Times people
English male non-fiction writers